The Mixed duet technical routine competition at the 2017 World Championships was held on 15 and 17 July 2017.

Results
The preliminary round was started on 15 July at 19:00. The final was held on 17 July at 11:00.

Green denotes finalists

References

Mixed duet technical routine
World Aquatics Championships